You to Me Are Everything is a 2010 Filipino romantic comedy film directed by Mark A. Reyes and starring Dingdong Dantes and Marian Rivera. The screenplay was written by Aloy Adlawan. The film was released on May 5, 2010, in the Philippines. The movie was produced by GMA Pictures.

Synopsis
Iska (Marian Rivera) is a simple, contented girl from the Cordillera mountains who suddenly inherits millions after the death of her real father. Raphael (Dingdong Dantes) is from a rich family who suddenly finds himself penniless after his father Frank is convicted of corruption in congress. The two meet when Ciska ends up in the mansion where Raphael used to live. Brought together by circumstance, Iska hires Raphael to be her business manager, showing her how to live the privileged life, while Iska, in turn, teaches Raphael how to find happiness in the little things in life. As the two struggle to find comfort in their new lives, they fall in love. But love, sometimes, comes with a price. Will they be willing to leave the life they love for the love of their life?

Cast
 Marian Rivera as Francisca "Iska" Carantes
 Dingdong Dantes as Rafael Iñigo Benitez III
 Isabel Oli as Megan
 Jaclyn Jose as Florencia Carantes
 Manilyn Reynes as Greta
 Bobby Andrews as Atty. Ronnie Domingo
 Roxanne Barcelo as Lily
 AJ Dee as Carding
 Andrea Torres as Therese Fernandez
 Bela Padilla as Monique Fernandez
 Carlo Gonzales as Baste
 Victor Aliwalas as Roy
 Fabio Ide as Miko
 Pinky Amador as Estella Fernandez
 Chinggoy Alonzo as Frank Benitez Jr.
 "Snowy" as Iska's pet
 Jai Reyes as Rado
 Piero Vergara as party goer
 Sef Cadayona as Sef

References

External links

2010 films
GMA Pictures films
Regal Entertainment films
2010s Tagalog-language films
Philippine romantic comedy films
2010 romantic comedy films
2010s English-language films
Films directed by Mark A. Reyes